The following are the winners of the 19th annual ENnie Awards, held in 2019:

Judges' Spotlight Winners 
Benjamin Adelman: The Stygian Library, Dying Stylishly Games, Author: Emmy Allen
Christopher Gath: Archives of the Sky, Aaron A. Reed, Author: Aaron A Reed
Alexander Holley: SIGMATA: This Signal Kills Fascists, Land of NOP LLC, Author: Chad Walker
Brent Jans: plot ARMOR, Mostly Harmless Games, Author: DC
Brian Nowak: The Elephant & Macaw Banner: Player’s Guide, Porcupine Publishing Author: Christopher Kastensmidt

Gold and Silver Winners

References

External links
 2019 ENnie Awards

 
ENnies winners